
Bomilcar was a Carthaginian commander in the Second Punic War (218–201BC).

He was the commander of the Carthaginian supplies which were voted to Hannibal after the Battle of Cannae (216BC) and with which he arrived in Italy in the ensuing year. They amounted to 4,000 Numidian cavalry, 40 war elephants, 500 or 1,000 talents of silver, grain, and other provisions. In 214BC, he was sent with 55 ships to the aid of Syracuse, then besieged by the Romans. Finding himself unable to cope with the superior fleet of the enemy, he withdrew to North Africa.

In 212BC, he escaped the harbour at Syracuse and carried to Carthage the news of the perilous state of the city, all of whichexcept Achradinawas in the possession of Marcellus. He returned within a few days with 100 ships.

In the same year, following the destruction by pestilence of the Carthaginian land-forces under Hippocrates and Himilco, Bomilcar again sailed to Carthage with the news and returned with 130 ships, but was prevented by Marcellus from reaching Syracuse. He then proceeded to Tarentum, apparently with the view to cutting off the supplies of the Roman garrison in that town. As the presence of his force only increased the scarcity under which the Tarentines themselves suffered, they were obliged to dismiss him.

See also
 Other Bomilcars in Carthaginian history
 Melqart, the Canaanite deity

References

Citations

Bibliography
 . 

Carthaginian commanders of the Second Punic War
3rd-century BC Punic people